In algebraic geometry, the Hurwitz scheme  is the scheme parametrizing pairs where C is a smooth curve of genus g and  has degree d.

References 

Algebraic geometry